Tibioploides arcuatus is a spider species found in Scandinavia, Russia and Estonia.

See also 
 List of Linyphiidae species (Q–Z)

References

External links 

Linyphiidae
Spiders of Europe
Spiders of Russia
Fauna of Scandinavia
Spiders described in 1955